Defence Act is a stock short title used in Australia, New Zealand, Ireland and the United Kingdom for legislation relating to territorial defence.

List

Australia
The Defence (Citizen Military Forces) Act 1943

New Zealand
The Defence Act 1886 (No 17)
 The Defence Act 1990

Ireland
The Defence (Amendment) Act 2011
The Defence (Miscellaneous Provisions) Act 2009
The Defence (Amendment) Act 2007
The Defence (Amendment) Act 2006
The Defence (Amendment) Act, 1998
The Defence (Amendment) Act, 1993
The Defence (Amendment) Act, 1990
The Defence (Amendment) Act, 1987
The Defence (Amendment) Act, 1979
The Defence (Amendment) (No. 2) Act, 1979
The Defence (Amendment) Act, 1960
The Defence (Amendment) (No. 2) Act, 1960
The Defence Act, 1954
The Civil Defence Act 2012
The Civil Defence Act, 2002
The Ombudsman (Defence Forces) Act 2004
The Defence Forces (Pensions) (Amendment) Act, 1975
The Defence Forces (Pensions) (Amendment) Act, 1968
The Defence Forces (Pensions) (Amendment) Act, 1957
The Defence Forces (Temporary Provisions) Act, 1954
The Defence Forces (Temporary Provisions) Act, 1953
The Defence Forces (Temporary Provisions) Act, 1952
The Defence Forces (Temporary Provisions) Act, 1951
The Defence Forces (Temporary Provisions) Act, 1950
The Defence Forces (Temporary Provisions) Act, 1949
The Defence Forces (Pensions) (Amendment) Act, 1949
The Defence Forces (Temporary Provisions) Act, 1948
The Defence Forces (Temporary Provisions) Act, 1947
The Defence Forces (Temporary Provisions) Act, 1946
The Defence Forces (Temporary Provisions) Act, 1945
The Defence Forces (Temporary Provisions) Act, 1944
The Defence Forces (Temporary Provisions) Act, 1943
The Defence Forces (Temporary Provisions) Act, 1942
The Defence Forces (Temporary Provisions) Act, 1941
The Defence Forces (Temporary Provisions) Act, 1940
The Defence Forces (Temporary Provisions) (No. 2) Act, 1940
The Defence Forces (Temporary Provisions) Act, 1939
The Defence Forces (Temporary Provisions) Act, 1938
The Defence Forces (Pensions) (Amendment) Act, 1938
The Defence Forces (Temporary Provisions) Act, 1937
The Defence Forces Act, 1937
The Defence Forces (Temporary Provisions) Act, 1936
The Defence Forces (Temporary Provisions) Act, 1935
The Defence Forces (Temporary Provisions) Act, 1934
The Defence Forces (Temporary Provisions) (No. 2) Act, 1934
The Defence Forces (Temporary Provisions) Act, 1933
The Defence Forces (Pensions) Act, 1932
The Defence Forces (Temporary Provisions) Act, 1931
The Defence Forces (Temporary Provisions) (No. 2) Act, 1931
The Defence Forces (Temporary Provisions) Act, 1930
The Defence Forces (Temporary Provisions) Act, 1929
The Defence Forces (Temporary Provisions) Act, 1927
The Defence Forces (Temporary Provisions) (No. 2) Act, 1927
The Defence Forces (Temporary Provisions) Act, 1926
The Defence Forces (Temporary Provisions) Act, 1925
The Defence Forces (Temporary Provisions) Act, 1923 (Continuance and Amendment) Act, 1924
The Defence Forces (Temporary Provisions) Act, 1923

Sweden

United Kingdom
The Defence (Transfer of Functions) Act 1964 (c 15)

The Defence Acts 1842 to 1873 is the collective title of the following Acts:
The Defence Act 1842 (5 & 6 Vict c 94)
The Defence Act 1854 (17 & 18 Vict c 67)
The Defence Act 1859 (22 Vict c 12)
The Defence Act 1860 (23 & 24 Vict c 112)
The Defence Act 1865 (28 & 29 Vict c 65)
The Defence Acts Amendment Act 1873 (36 & 37 Vict c 72)

See also
Armed Forces Act
List of short titles

References

Lists of legislation by short title